Events in the year 2022 in Guinea-Bissau.

Incumbents
 President: Umaro Sissoco Embaló 
 Prime Minister: Nuno Gomes Nabiam

Events
Ongoing — COVID-19 pandemic in Guinea-Bissau
 1 February 2022 : A coup d'état to oust Embaló was attempted on 1 February 2022. He said that "many" members of the security forces had been killed in a "failed attack against democracy."

Deaths
 1 February 2022 :

References

 
2020s in Guinea-Bissau
Years of the 21st century in Guinea-Bissau
Guinea-Bissau
Guinea-Bissau